is a Japanese footballer who plays as a winger for Moriyama Samurai 2000.

Club career
Born in Nagoya, Ito made his senior debut for Kyoto Sanga during the 2011 season. He signed a contract extension with the club in September 2011, and spent the 2013 on loan at Ehime. He moved to Albirex Niigata in January 2016. He joined Aventura Kawaguchi after a small stint with Kataller Toyama in March 2020.

Club statistics
Updated to 23 February 2020.

References

External links
Profile at Albirex Niigata

1992 births
Living people
Association football people from Aichi Prefecture
Japanese footballers
J1 League players
J2 League players
J3 League players
Kyoto Sanga FC players
Ehime FC players
Albirex Niigata players
Kataller Toyama players
Association football midfielders